Allor ch'io dissi addio (HWV 80) is a dramatic secular cantata (a vocal composition with an instrumental accompaniment) for soprano written by Georg Frideric Handel in 1707–08. Other catalogues of Handel's music have referred to the work as HG l,8 (there is no HHA designation of the work). The title of the cantata translates as "Then I said goodbye".

History
The cantata is one of the many that Handel composed in Rome whilst in his early twenties.

Synopsis

The text tells of someone who thought they could conquer their feelings as they leave their loved one behind, however that proves to be impossible.

Structure
The work is scored for solo soprano and keyboard (with scattered figured bass markings). The cantata contains two recitative-aria pairings.

A typical performance of the work takes about eight minutes.

Movements
The work consists of four movements:

(Movements do not contain repeat markings unless indicated. The number of bars is the raw number in the manuscript—not including repeat markings. The above is taken from volume 50, starting at page 8, of the Händel-Gesellschaft edition.)

See also
List of cantatas by George Frideric Handel

References

External links
 (HWV 80 starts on page 8)

Cantatas by George Frideric Handel
1708 cantatas